is the collective pen name used by female manga artists  and . The former draws the foreground and characters, while the latter draws the backgrounds.

The duo started out as an assistant to Motohiro Kato, before being put in charge of illustrations on Alive: The Final Evolution. Following that series' completion, they began Noragami, which is what they are currently working on as of June 2021.

Biography
Adachitoka is made up of Adachi, who was born on December 14 in Murayama, Yamagata, and Tokashiki, who was born on November 28 in Naha. After graduating from college, they moved to Tokyo and submitted their work to the Monthly Jump editorial department. They rejected it, but told them to submit it to the Afternoon department instead. After a lack of response, they decided to submit for the Monthly Shōnen Magazine award. After that, they worked as an assistant to Motohiro Kato.

The pair debuted in 2003 with the illustrations for the manga series Alive: The Final Evolution. The series was serialized in Monthly Shōnen Magazine until 2010. An anime television series adaptation was announced, but later canceled following Gonzo's delisting from the Tokyo Stock Exchange.

Following the completion of Alive: The Final Evolution in 2010, they were out of work. When getting ideas for a new series, they went back to a one-shot they had previously written. The end result was Noragami, which started serialization in Monthly Shōnen Magazine in December 2010. The series was nominated for the Kodansha Manga Award in 2014 and 2016, and received an anime television series adaptation, which ran for two seasons. In 2020, they wrote a manga series as part of a collaboration by multiple Japanese companies to stop piracy.

Works
 (2003—2010) (serialized in Monthly Shōnen Magazine; story by Tadashi Kawashima)
 (2010—present) (serialized in Monthly Shōnen Magazine)

References

External links
 

Art duos
Collective pseudonyms
Living people
Manga artists from Okinawa Prefecture
Manga artists from Yamagata Prefecture
Pseudonymous women writers
21st-century pseudonymous writers
Women manga artists
Year of birth missing (living people)